Canaan Fair Trade is a supplier of organic and fair trade ingredients olive oil, Almonds, Almond Oil, Carob Syrup, Freekeh, Maftoul to Europe, North America and the Middle East. It was founded in 2004 by Palestinian-American Nasser Abufarha and is based in the West Bank city of Jenin.

Canaan's products—including organic fair trade olive oil, Maftoul, Freekeh, and za'atar—are produced by over 1,700 farmers in the West Bank organized in informal cooperatives and represented by the Palestine Fair Trade Association.

Canaan Fair Trade also supplies 90% of the organic olive oil used by the U.S. company Dr. Bronner's Magic Soap.

The organization has a scholarship program for the children of its farmers, awarding 4-year full-tuition scholarships to West Bank universities to four students each year. 

The facility is designed to become both the organization's headquarters, as well as a tourist attraction, and will offer guided tours as well as a boutique selling fair trade products. It is expected to be completed in December 2008.

References

 Palestine Fair Trade Association - About Us
 Leadership Award, Citizenship Category.
 Palestine Exporter of the Year Award
 One World Award
 Canaan Palestine, Nasser Abufarha : A Growing Seed.
 Leader of the fair trade movement in Palestine.
 Reshaping Olive Industry to Boost Palestinian Economy.

General references
 Nasser Abufarha: Scholar and social entrepreneur at IMEU.net
 Palestinian fair trade company opens state-of-the-art facility near Jenin, IMEU, Nov. 28, 2008

External links
 

Jenin
Non-profit organizations based in the State of Palestine
Fair trade organizations
Organizations established in 2004